Silverman may refer to:

 a kind of living statue

Surnames 
 Abraham George Silverman (1900–1973), American mathematician
 Allan Silverman (born 1955), American philosopher
 Barry G. Silverman (born 1951), American federal judge
 Belle Miriam Silverman, better known as Beverly Sills (1929–2007), American singer
 Ben Silverman, American TV producer
 Ben Silverman (born 1987), Canadian professional PGA golfer
 Bernard Silverman (born 1952), British statistician
Bernard Silverman (politician) (1838–1898), American politician
 Billy Silverman (born 1962), American pro wrestling referee  
 Craig Silverman, Canadian journalist and media editor
 David Silverman (disambiguation), several people
 Debra T. Silverman, American biostatistician and cancer epidemiologist
 Edwin Silverman (1898–1970), American theatre owner and operator
 Erica Silverman, author of Big Pumpkin
 Fred Silverman (1937–2020), American TV executive and producer
 Jonathan Silverman (born 1966), American actor
 Joseph Silverman (1860–1930), American rabbi
 Joseph H. Silverman (born 1955), mathematician
 Joy Silverman (born 1947), American political bundler and socialite
 Julius Silverman (1905–1996), British politician
 Kaja Silverman (born 1947), American film critic
 Ken Silverman (born 1975), American game programmer
 Laura Silverman (born 1966), American actress
 Leonard Silverman (1930–2015), American politician and judge
 Louis Lazarus Silverman (1884–1967), American mathematician
 Matthew Silverman (born 1976), American General Manager and President for Baseball Operations for the Tampa Bay Rays
 Paul H. Silverman (1924–2004), American medical researcher
 Peter Silverman (born 1931), Canadian journalist
 Robert Silverman (cycling activist) (1933-2022), Canadian cycling activist
 Robert Silverman (born 1938), Canadian pianist
 Robert A. Silverman (born 1943), Canadian actor
 Sarah Silverman (born 1970), American comedian and actress
 Steven Silverman (born 1954), American politician
 Susan Silverman (born 1963), American-Israeli Reform rabbi
 Syd Silverman (1932–2017), American owner and publisher of Variety magazine
 Sydney Silverman (1895–1968), British Labour politician
 Sime Silverman (1873–1933), American newspaper publisher 
 Tracy Silverman (born 1960), American violinist, composer, and producer
 William Silverman (1917–2004), American pediatrician

Other 
 Silverman v. United States, 365 U.S. 505 (1961)
 Robinson, Silverman, Pearce, Aronsohn, and Berman, law firm in New York City, NY, US (1950-2003)
 Silverman–Toeplitz theorem
 Silverman's game, a problem in game theory
 Saving Silverman, a 2001 comedy film
 Songs for Silverman, an album by Ben Folds

See also

Jewish surnames